The David Gray House is a historic house in Andover, Massachusetts, United States.  The -story colonial was built for David Gray, a local farmer, in about 1812, and it remained in his family until the 1930s.  It is five bays wide, with a side gable roof, central chimney, and a projecting entry vestibule that has a door surround consisting of a pedimented top and fluted pilasters on the sides.  Additions extend the house to the left.

The house was added to the National Register of Historic Places in 1982.

See also
National Register of Historic Places listings in Andover, Massachusetts
National Register of Historic Places listings in Essex County, Massachusetts

References

Houses in Andover, Massachusetts
Houses completed in 1812
National Register of Historic Places in Andover, Massachusetts
Houses on the National Register of Historic Places in Essex County, Massachusetts